The forktail lates (Lates microlepis) is a species of lates perch endemic to Lake Tanganyika. Juveniles inhabit inshore habitats, moving as adults to open-water pelagic zones where it preys on other fishes. It is a commercially important species and is also popular as a game fish.

References

Lates
Taxonomy articles created by Polbot
Fish described in 1898